The music for the anime series Ghost in the Shell: Stand Alone Complex was primarily composed by Yoko Kanno and produced by Victor Entertainment. Soundtracks were also produced for the two OVA films, The Laughing Man and Individual Eleven, and the TV film Solid State Society.

Concept and creation

When creating the music of Ghost in the Shell: Stand Alone Complex, Yoko Kanno wanted to create music that would contrast from the formal and "manly" world that appeared in the original manga. In order to do so, Kanno implemented themes of being human and "tangible fuzziness" into the music. Sound Director, Kazuhiro Wakabayashi, provided
menus for Kanno to follow in which she described as "delicate emotional feelings  that were like poems."

Theme songs
Yoko Kanno composed the music for all of the opening and closing themes for Ghost in the Shell: Stand Alone Complex, its second season, film sequel and OVAs. When creating the theme song "Inner Universe", Kanno used the image of digital bits and composed the score consisting of recurrent quick beats.

Ghost in the Shell: Stand Alone Complex
The opening theme for Stand Alone Complex is "Inner Universe", performed by Origa, with lyrics written by Origa and Shanti Snyder in Russian, English and Latin. The closing theme for Stand Alone Complex is "Lithium Flower", performed by Scott Matthew, with lyrics by Tim Jensen.

When terrestrial television later re-broadcast the series, "Inner Universe" was replaced with "GET9" (performed by jillmax and written by Tim Jensen), while "Lithium Flower" was replaced with "I Do" (written and performed by Ilaria Graziano).

Ghost in the Shell: S.A.C. 2nd GIG
The opening theme for Ghost in the Shell: S.A.C. 2nd GIG is "Rise", performed by Origa, with lyrics written by Origa and Tim Jensen. The closing theme is "Living Inside the Shell", performed by Steve Conte and written by Shanti Snyder.

2nd GIG also used alternate themes for its opening and closing credits when it was re-broadcast on terrestrial television. "Rise" was replaced with "CHRisTmas in the SiLenT ForeSt" (performed by Ilaria Graziano and written by Shanti Snyder), while "Living Inside the Shell" was replaced with "Somewhere in the Silence (Sniper's Theme)" (performed by Ilaria Graziano and written by Tim Jensen).

Albums

Ghost in the Shell: Stand Alone Complex O.S.T.

 is the first original soundtrack to the anime series Ghost in the Shell: Stand Alone Complex, composed by Yoko Kanno and co-produced by Toshiaki Ota. It features music composed for the first season of the series, and is produced by composer Kanno, Victor Entertainment and Bandai. A later release of the album, entitled , contains TV edits of the themes "GET9" from the terrestrial broadcasts of S.A.C. and "rise" from 2nd GIG. Early copies of O.S.T.+, were incorrectly mastered and tracks on the CD differed from the track listing.

Ghost in the Shell: Stand Alone Complex "be Human"

 is an album featuring music from the anime series Ghost in the Shell: Stand Alone Complex, composed by Yoko Kanno. The featured music primarily relates to Tachikomas, the "think tank" combat robots from the series; music from the omake miniseries Tachikomatic Days is also included. The albums features vocals from Scott Matthew, Gabriela Robin, Maaya Sakamoto, HIDE, SUNNY and Sakiko Tamagawa and was produced by composer Kanno, Victor Entertainment and Bandai. The sleeve insert includes punch-out sections which combine to create a paper Tachikoma.

"GET9"

"GET9" is a single taken from the soundtrack to the anime series Ghost in the Shell: Stand Alone Complex, composed by Yoko Kanno. "GET9" was used as the opening theme for the terrestrial broadcast version of the first season of Stand Alone Complex. "Rise", also featured on this single, was used as the opening theme for the satellite broadcast version of the second season, Ghost in the Shell: S.A.C. 2nd GIG. It was produced by composer Kanno, Victor Entertainment and Bandai.

Ghost in the Shell: Stand Alone Complex O.S.T. 2

 is the second original soundtrack to the anime series Ghost in the Shell: Stand Alone Complex, composed by Yoko Kanno. It primarily features music from the series' second season, Ghost in the Shell: S.A.C. 2nd GIG, in addition to several songs from the first season. The soundtrack was produced by composer Kanno, Victor Entertainment and Bandai.

Ghost in the Shell: Stand Alone Complex O.S.T. 3

 is the third original soundtrack to the anime series Ghost in the Shell: Stand Alone Complex, composed by Yoko Kanno. As with O.S.T. 2, it primarily features music from the series' second season, Ghost in the Shell: S.A.C. 2nd GIG, in addition to several songs from the first season. The soundtrack was produced by composer Kanno, Victor Entertainment and Bandai.

Ghost in the Shell: Stand Alone Complex - Solid State Society O.S.T.

 is the original soundtrack to the made-for-TV anime film Ghost in the Shell: Stand Alone Complex - Solid State Society, composed by Yoko Kanno. It features music composed specifically for the film, in addition to music from the first and second series of Ghost in the Shell: Stand Alone Complex. The soundtrack was produced by composer Kanno, Victor Entertainment and Bandai.

Ghost in the Shell: Stand Alone Complex CD-Box

 is the fourth original soundtrack to the anime series Ghost in the Shell: Stand Alone Complex, composed by Yoko Kanno. It features music from both seasons of the series as well as the film Solid State Society and is produced by composer Kanno, Toshiaki Ota, Victor Entertainment, and Bandai.

The album was released exclusively as a part of the Ghost in the Shell: Stand Alone Complex CD-Box box set, which also included all of the above albums and a Tachikoma-style USB memory stick featuring previously unreleased music from Tachikomatic Days, as well as voice clips, images, and video. Stand Alone Complex O.S.T. 4- is presented as a continuous, single-track mix and consists of "16 pieces".

References

External links

Ghost in the Shell: Stand Alone Complex - Be Human at Amazon.com
Ghost in the Shell: Stand Alone Complex - Be Human at cdjapan.co.jp

Ghost in the Shell: Stand Alone Complex O.S.T at Amazon.com
Ghost in the Shell: Stand Alone Complex O.S.T at cdjapan.co.jp
Ghost in the Shell: Stand Alone Complex O.S.T at the Yoko Kanno Project 

2003 soundtrack albums
Albums produced by Yoko Kanno
Anime soundtracks
Music